Sir Alistair Geoffrey MacDuff (born 26 May 1945) is a retired British judge of the High Court of England and Wales.

Legal career
MacDuff was called to the bar at Lincoln's Inn in 1969 and made a Queen's Counsel in 1993. From 1987 to 1997, he was a Recorder. From 1997 to 2008, he was a circuit judge on the Midland and Oxford Circuit latterly designated to hear civil cases in Birmingham; in 2002, he became a senior circuit judge. On 14 April 2008, MacDuff was appointed a Justice of the High Court, receiving the customary knighthood, and assigned to the Queen's Bench Division.

References

1945 births
Living people
Knights Bachelor
Queen's Bench Division judges
British King's Counsel
Members of Lincoln's Inn